Andreas Tsipras (born 7 October 1993) is a Greek professional footballer who plays as a forward for Gamma Ethniki club Panionios.

References

1993 births
Living people
Greek footballers
Football League (Greece) players
Gamma Ethniki players
Acharnaikos F.C. players
Ethnikos Asteras F.C. players
Fokikos A.C. players
Kallithea F.C. players
Trikala F.C. players
Iraklis Thessaloniki F.C. players
Association football forwards
Asteras Vlachioti F.C. players
Footballers from Central Greece
People from Evrytania